Charley or Charlie Moore may refer to:

Charley Moore (1884–1970), American baseball player
Charlie Moore (baseball) (born 1953), American baseball player 
Charlie Moore (footballer, born 1898) (1898–1966), English footballer for Manchester United
Charlie Moore (footballer, born 1905) (1905–1972), English footballer for Bradford City
Charlie Moore (Australian rules footballer) (1875–1901), Australian rules footballer for Essendon
Charlie Moore (television personality) (born 1970), American television sports personality
Charlie Moore (basketball) (born 1998), American basketball player
Charlie Moore, character in 13Hrs
Charlie Moore, character in Head of the Class

See also
Charles Moore (disambiguation)